The 1948 All-Ireland Senior Football Championship Final was the 61st All-Ireland Final and the deciding match of the 1948 All-Ireland Senior Football Championship, an inter-county Gaelic football tournament for the top teams in Ireland. Contested by a team from the Ulster (Cavan) and a team from Connacht (Mayo), such a meeting in the decider between teams from these provinces would not happen again until 2012.

Pre-match
Cavan were the defending All-Ireland champions.

Match summary
Cavan retained the title they had won in 1947 at the Polo Grounds in Manhattan, New York City.

In a heavy wind, Cavan led 3-2 to 0-0 at half-time, but Mayo came back to lead the game. Cavan eventually made it two-in-a-row with a Peter Donahue point. This final's eight goals is the most scored in a final, a record shared with the 1977 match.

References

All-Ireland Senior Football Championship Final
All-Ireland Senior Football Championship Final, 1948
All-Ireland Senior Football Championship Final
All-Ireland Senior Football Championship Finals
Cavan county football team matches
Mayo county football team matches